Arne Haugen Sørensen (born 27 April 1932) is a Danish painter and illustrator. Since the 1980s, he has become one of Denmark's most productive religious artists, decorating over 25 churches.

Biography
Born in Copenhagen, Haugen Sørensen had little training in art apart from evening courses in drawing and, after he arrived in Paris in 1950, brief introductions to etching and lithography in the schools run by Stanley William Hayter and Johnny Friedlander. Like his younger brother, Jørgen Haugen Sørensen, he was essentially self-taught as an artist.

He debuted in 1953, at Kunsterners efterårsudstilling, thereafter regularly exhibiting at the Charlottenborg autumn exhibition and from 1967 at Grønningen. He also exhibited frequently in Paris, beginning with the 9e Salon de la Jeune Peinture in 1958. A long stay in Mallorca in 1962-63 enhanced his painting, inspired by bright light, colour and the underwater world he experienced as a diver. His early works appear rather abstract but he increasingly introduced animals and human figures. His work also benefited from his encounters with Asger Jorn, Echaurren Matta and Antonio Saura whom he met at the Clot et George workshop run by Peter Bramsen.

By the time he moved back to Denmark in 1967, Haugen Sørensen had developed his own style of Expressionist figurative painting in vivid colours, ironically presenting man's animal instincts and the absurdity of life. In the 1970s, he began to use acrylics, often with several layers of paint, in works including Pastorale med indbyggede katastrofer (1975), Dyr og damer (1979) and Frokost i det grønne (1979). Many of his works depict a predator pursuing a female victim, contrasting fear with aggression.

Since the 1980s, Haugen Sørensen has become one of Denmark's most productive religious artists, decorating more than 25 churches with forceful, provocative works in a variety of art forms including painting, frescos, stained glass, ceramics and sculpture. His subjects include the Binding of Isaac, the Last Supper, the Crucifixion, the Resurrection and the Supper at Emmaus.

Since 1981, Haugen Sørensen has lived with his wife, the ceramist Dorthe Krabbe, near Malaga in Spain. Now in his 80s, he is still an active artist.

Awards
In 1975, Haugen Sørensen was awarded the Eckersberg Medal and, in 1984, the Thorvaldsen Medal. Also in 1984, he was decorated a Knight of the Order of the Dannebrog.

References

Literature

External links
Listings of Arne Haugen Sørensen's exhibitions and museums where his work is represented from KunstOnline 
Illustrated list of Arne Haugen Sørensen's works in Danish museums

1932 births
Living people
20th-century Danish painters
21st-century Danish painters
Danish illustrators
20th-century Danish ceramists
Artists from Copenhagen
Recipients of the Thorvaldsen Medal
Recipients of the Eckersberg Medal
Knights of the Order of the Dannebrog
20th-century Danish sculptors
Male sculptors
Lutheran art
21st-century ceramists
Danish male artists
20th-century Danish male artists